Eduardo Oliveira may refer to:

 Eduardo Oliveira (footballer, born 1972), full name Eduardo Oliveira dos Santos, Brazilian football manager and former player
 Eduardo Oliveira (footballer, born 1982), full name Eduardo Gonçalves Torres de Oliveira, Brazilian football manager and former player